Bebearia phantasina, the western fantasia, is a butterfly in the family Nymphalidae. It is found in Senegal, Guinea-Bissau, Guinea, Sierra Leone, Liberia, Ivory Coast, Ghana, Togo and Nigeria. The habitat consists of forests and dense secondary growth.

Adults are attracted to fermenting fruit.

Subspecies
Bebearia phantasina phantasina (Guinea, Sierra Leone, Liberia, Ivory Coast, Ghana, Togo, western Nigeria)
Bebearia phantasina ultima Hecq, 1990 (Senegal, Guinea-Bissau, Guinea)

References

Butterflies described in 1891
phantasina
Butterflies of Africa